In 1963, the United States FBI, under Director J. Edgar Hoover, continued for a fourteenth year to maintain a public list of the people it regarded as the Ten Most Wanted Fugitives.

As the year 1963 began, eight of the ten places on the list remained filled by these elusive long-time fugitives from prior years, then still at large:

 1950 #14 (thirteen years), Frederick J. Tenuto remained still at large
 1954 #78 (nine years), David Daniel Keegan process dismissed December 13, 1963
 1956 #97 (seven years), Eugene Francis Newman remained still at large
 1960 #137 (three years), Donald Leroy Payne remained still at large
 1960 #143 (three years), John B. Everhart arrested November 6, 1963
 1961 #158 (two years), John Gibson Dillon remained still at large
 1962 #166 (one year), Harry Robert Grove, Jr. arrested January 26, 1963
 1962 #170 (one year), Edward Howard Maps remained still at large

By year end, despite the nearly full list, the FBI had added another nine new fugitives.

1963 fugitives

The "Ten Most Wanted Fugitives" listed by the FBI in 1963 include (in FBI list appearance sequence order):

Harold Thomas O'Brien
January 4, 1963 #175
Two years on the list
Harold Thomas O'Brien - PROCESS DISMISSED January 14, 1965 by federal and local authorities in Lake City, Illinois

Jerry Clarence Rush
January 14, 1963 #176
Two months on the list
Jerry Clarence Rush - U.S. prisoner arrested March 25, 1963 in Bay Harbor Islands, Florida

Marshall Frank Chrisman
February 7, 1963 #177
Three months on the list
Marshall Frank Chrisman - U.S. prisoner apprehended May 21, 1963 in Los Angeles, California by local authorities who identified him by a routine fingerprint check after he robbed a grocery store

Howard Jay Barnard
April 12, 1963 #178
One year on the list
Howard Jay Barnard - U.S. prisoner arrested April 6, 1964 in North Sacramento, California by local police after robbing a motel of $1,000. At the time of apprehension, Barnard was wearing two sets of clothes, actor's makeup and gold hair. He had cotton stuffed in his nose and mouth to disfigure his face. Officers had to remove glue from his hands so he could be fingerprinted.

Leroy Ambrosia Frazier
June 4, 1963 #179
Three months on the list
Leroy Ambrosia Frazier - U.S. prisoner arrested September 12, 1963 in Cleveland, Ohio by FBI and local police after a citizen recognized him from media coverage

Carl Close
September 25, 1963 #180
One day on the list
Carl Close - U.S. prisoner apprehended September 26, 1963 in Anderson, South Carolina by local authorities after
robbing a bank

Thomas Asbury Hadder
October 9, 1963 #181
Three months on the list
Thomas Asbury Hadder - U.S. prisoner arrested January 13, 1964 in Oklahoma City, Oklahoma by FBI Agents shortly after
he registered at the Salvation Army Center under a fictitious name

Alfred Oponowicz
November 27, 1963 #182
One year on the list
Alfred Oponowicz - U.S. prisoner captured December 23, 1964 in Painesville, Ohio He was discovered by the Secret Service in a small building where he had set up a money printing press.  He tried to escape and was shot in the leg by a Secret Service agent.  He was subsequently taken to a local hospital where he overcame a deputy and escaped with the officers pistol and clothing.   He was spotted by local youths who reported a man limping on railroad tracks.  He tried to evade arrest by hiding in a water filled ditch.  He was captured by Painesville Police and remanded to the custody of the Secret Service and Lake County Sheriff Department.

Arthur William Couts
December 27, 1963 #183
One month on the list
Arthur William Couts - U.S. prisoner arrested January 30, 1964 in Philadelphia, Pennsylvania by FBI Agents for armed bank robberies. Attempting to disguise his appearance, Couts had grown a heavy mustache and dyed his hair.  Served sentence in Greater Rutherford Penitentiary. Last known residence was South Florida.

See also

Later entries
FBI Ten Most Wanted Fugitives, 2020s
FBI Ten Most Wanted Fugitives, 2010s
FBI Ten Most Wanted Fugitives, 2000s
FBI Ten Most Wanted Fugitives, 1990s
FBI Ten Most Wanted Fugitives, 1980s
FBI Ten Most Wanted Fugitives, 1970s
FBI Ten Most Wanted Fugitives, 1960s

Prior entries
FBI Ten Most Wanted Fugitives, 1950s

References

External links
Current FBI top ten most wanted fugitives at FBI site
FBI pdf source document listing all Ten Most Wanted year by year (removed by FBI)

1963 in the United States